Marian Records is a Nashville-based record label specializing in pop music with an initial emphasis in electronic and dance music including commercial crossover, house, trance and progressive styles.  Formed in 2005, Marian Records' exclusive distributor is RED Distribution (a unit of Sony/ BMG Entertainment).  Marian Records' artists include Ella, Siria, Barcera, Volare, Jaymen, Joey Peate, and Sarah Taylor.  Marian Records is also home to the MAX brand of dance compilations. Marian Records has enjoyed three singles thus far on the Billboard charts.

See also
 List of record labels

External links
 Marian Distribution, Inc.

American record labels
Record labels established in 2005
Electronic music record labels
Pop record labels
Electronic dance music record labels
House music record labels
Trance record labels